Upaar Lagoon is an estuarine lagoon in Batticaloa District, eastern Sri Lanka.

The lagoon is fed by a number of small rivers. It is linked to the sea by a narrow channel to the south.

The lagoon is surrounded by evergreen forest and scrubland. The land is used for subsistence fishing and some rice cultivation.

The lagoon has extensive mangrove swamps and some sea grass beds. The lagoon attracts a wide variety of water birds.

References
 

Bodies of water of Batticaloa District
Lagoons of Sri Lanka
Landforms of Eastern Province, Sri Lanka